Unerforschtes Gebiet is the seventh solo album from German ambient music producer, Thomas Köner. Originally released in 2001 only as a limited number picture disc LP (700 numbered copies; repressed in 2004, this time not individually  numbered). Re-released on CD in 2003.

"Unerforschtes Gebiet" is German for "unexplored area," typically the blank areas of old maps. The picture on the disc is a map of the Arctic region, the center hole coinciding with the North Pole. The B side has the same image, mirrored.

Track listing
 Original LP, catalogue number DS43
"Unerforschtes Gebiet A" – 21:17
"Unerforschtes Gebiet B" – 21:31

 CD re-release, catalogue number DS56
"Unerforschtes Gebiet A" – 21:17
"Unerforschtes Gebiet B" – 21:31
"Les Sœurs Lumière" - 27:26

References

2001 albums
Thomas Köner albums
Albums produced by Thomas Köner